Patrick Petrus Marinus van Balkom (born September 14, 1974) is a former Dutch sprinter. Together with Caimin Douglas, Timothy Beck and Troy Douglas he won a bronze medal in 4 x 100 metres relay at the 2003 World Championships in Athletics. With this same team he also participated at the 2004 Summer Olympics, but they were eliminated in the series due to a mistake in the changing area.

Van Balkom also won a 200 metres bronze medal at the 2001 IAAF World Indoor Championships. On September 3, 2006 he ran his last race at the Arena Games in Hilversum.

Van Balkom was born in Waalwijk, North Brabant.

Personal bests
 100 metres – 10.23 (1998)
 200 metres – 20.36 (1999, 2000, 2001)
 400 metres – 46.80 (2003)

External links
 

1974 births
Living people
People from Waalwijk
Dutch male sprinters
Olympic athletes of the Netherlands
Athletes (track and field) at the 2004 Summer Olympics
World Athletics Championships medalists
World Athletics Championships athletes for the Netherlands
Universiade medalists in athletics (track and field)
Universiade silver medalists for the Netherlands
World Athletics Indoor Championships medalists
Medalists at the 1999 Summer Universiade
Sportspeople from North Brabant